A referendum on the law of succession was held in Spain on 6 July 1947. The Law of Succession to the Headship of the State was intended to provide for the restoration of the Spanish monarchy. The law appointed Francisco Franco as Head of State for life until his death or resignation, but also granted him the power to appoint his successor as King or Regent of the Kingdom and thereby formally established a new Kingdom of Spain.

The question asked was "Do you approve of the Law of Succession to the Headship of the State Bill?". It was reportedly approved by 95.1% of valid votes on a turnout of 88.6%.

Results

References

1947 referendums
1947 in Spain
Monarchy referendums
Referendums in Spain
Francoist Spain